Leopoldo Soto Norambuena is a Chilean Physicist born in Santiago, Chile, on October 14, 1964. His publication appears with the name Leopoldo Soto or L. Soto. He works at the Comisión Chilena de Energía Nuclear where he founded the Plasma Physics and Nuclear Fusion Laboratory. His main contributions are in experimental physics (plasma physics in particular). The group that he created and leads is a pioneer in the miniaturization of dense plasma focus devices which can reproduce, on a scale basis, similar physics as the ones obtained in large devices which are only available in large laboratories of the world. Due to Soto's contributions, it is possible to develop relevant research in dense transient plasmas using small devices.

He received the B.S., M.S. and Ph.D. degrees in Physics in 1989, 1990 and 1993, respectively, from the Pontificia Universidad Católica de Chile. His Ph.D. thesis was advised by Hernán Chuaqui. His Ph.D. was the first to be granted by a Chilean University  for a thesis in experimental physics. The results of his thesis were published in the journal Physical Review Letters, being this the first time an article in experimental plasma physics produced in Chile was accepted in that prestigious journal.

When he arrived at the Comisión Chilena de Energía Nuclear, he started to work in plasmas driven by small transient electrical discharges and small pulsed power devices: z-pinch, capillary discharges and plasma focus. His work has contributed to understand that it is possible to scale the plasma focus in a wide range of energies and sizes, keeping the same value of ion density, magnetic field, plasma sheath velocity, Alfvén speed and the quantity of energy per particle. Therefore, fusion reactions are possible to be obtained in ultra-miniaturized devices (driven by generators of 0.1J for example), as well as they are obtained in bigger devices (driven by generators of 1MJ). However, the stability of the plasma pinch highly depends on the size and energy of the device. A rich plasma phenomenology it has been observed in the table-top plasma focus devices developed by Soto's group: filamentary structures, toroidal singularities, plasma bursts and plasma jets generations. In addition, possible applications are explored using these kind of small plasma devices: development of portable generator as non-radioactive sources of neutrons and x-rays for field applications, pulsed radiation applied to biological studies, plasma focus as neutron source for nuclear fusion-fission hybrid reactors, and the use of plasma focus devices as plasma accelerators for studies of materials under intense fusion-relevant pulses.

In 1990, he received a fellowship for Ph.D. studies from Fundación Andes, Chile. In 1999, he was awarded with a Presidential Chair in Science by the president of Chile. In 2007, he was elected as Fellow of the Institute of Physics, UK. He was the president of the Chilean Physical Society for 2 periods, from April 2003 to April 2008, and its secretary general from April 2013 to April 2015.

He has also contributed to the democratization of knowledge by creating the YouTube “Ciencia Entretenida” channel. With the direction of Vanessa Miller and with the participation of professional actors, Daniel Alcaino and Javiera Acevedo, they develop videos to motivate new generations for sciences and to inform to general public, in an entertaining and didactic way.

References

External links
 Members Thermonuclear Plasma Department of the Chilean Nuclear Energy Commission
 Scientists and Staff P4 Group

1964 births
Living people
20th-century physicists
21st-century physicists
Chilean physicists